Cornélie-Pétronille-Bénédicte Wouters (October 14, 1737 – April 3, 1802), known as the baroness of Vassé, was a Belgian woman of letters known for her work as a translator in the 18th century.

Biography 
Cornélie Wouters de Vassé was born in Brussels in 1737. She was one of at least seven children born to Jacques Corneille and Catherine Marguerite Wouters.

She moved to Paris after the death of her husband, the wealthy baron of Vassé, and it was there that she began to write and translate for a living in 1782. She often collaborated with her sister Marie Thérèse Wouters, who helped her translate works into French from English, including The British Plutarch by Thomas Mortimer.

In 1790, she became the only woman of the period to have contributed to the public debate over Jews' rights in France, producing a pamphlet in their defense. She argued they should be given full civil and political rights, without having to give up their religious beliefs.

She died in Paris in 1802.

Selected works

Writing 

 L’Art de corriger et de rendre les hommes constans (dialogue), 1782.
 Le Nouveau Continent (philosophical tale), 1783.
 Le Char volant, ou Voyage dans la lune (philosophical tale), 1783.

Translation 

 Traduction du théâtre anglois depuis l’origine des spectacles jusqu’à nos jours, 12 vol., (with Marie Wouters) 1784–1787.
 La Vie des hommes illustres d’Angleterre, d’Écosse et d’Irlande, ou le Plutarque anglois, from Thomas Mortimer's The British Plutarch, 1785.

External links 

 Cornélie Wouters de Vassé on Wikisource (in French)

References 

1737 births
1802 deaths
Women of the Austrian Netherlands
French translators
18th-century French women writers
Writers from Brussels
Writers of the Austrian Netherlands